Roger Corman Presents was a series of films made for Showtime by movie producer Roger Corman.

Production
Showtime approached Corman with the idea of doing a series of science fiction and horror feature films. They started filming in January 1995 and finished shooting 13 films in mid June. Corman said, "I don't think a day went by that we weren't shooting. We were shooting on weekends, we were shooting at our studio here. We were shooting at local locations, and we shot one film in Moscow and one film in Manila. So we were all over the world with this thing."

Corman ended up re-making two more films in the first season. According to Corman, "They were actually chosen by Showtime who did a lot of market research. I had said I didn't want to remake the Edgar Allan Poe pictures, because I didn't want to do those without Vincent, and also the period style of the pictures means that they're as new now as they were when they were made. Because the 19th century is the 19th century. Whereas the other pictures... being contemporary films could easily be remade, brought up to date, re-written for the '90s."

The other nine were originals. Corman said, "One of them, we purchased a screenplay because we couldn't develop enough. We had three of the thirteen shot before this year, and I shot the other ten in five and a half months. We couldn't develop all the scripts so a picture called Terminal Virus was the script that we bought and it will be the last one to go on, and all the rest were scripts that we developed ourselves."

Movies were still sporadically released under the Roger Corman Presents banner through 1999.

Select filmography

First season
Ep. 1 - Suspect Device – aired 11 July 1995
Ep. 2 - The Alien Within a.k.a. Unknown Origin – 18 July 1995
Ep. 3 - Sawbones – 25 July 1995
Ep. 4 - Virtual Seduction – 1 August 1995
Ep. 5 - Burial of the Rats –  8 August 1995
Ep. 6 - Not Like Us – 15 August 1995
Ep. 7 - Black Scorpion – 22 August 1995 (USA)
Ep. 8 - The Wasp Woman – 29 August 1995
Ep. 9 - Not of This Earth – 5 September 1995
Ep. 10 - A Bucket of Blood a.k.a. Dark Secrets and The Death Artist – 12 September 1995
Ep. 11 - Hellfire  a.k.a. Blood Song – 26 September 1995
Ep. 12 - Piranha – 1 October 1995
Ep. 13 - Terminal Virus – 3 October 1995
Ep. 14 - Where Evil Lies

Second season
Ep. 15 - Spectre a.k.a. House of the Damned – 13 July 1996
Ep. 16 - Inhumanoid a.k.a. Circuit Breaker – 20 July 1996
Ep. 17 - Alien Avengers a.k.a. Welcome to Planet Earth – 3 August 1996
Ep. 18 - Shadow of a Scream – 10 August 1996
Ep. 19 - Subliminal Seduction – 10 August 1996
Ep. 20 - Last Exit to Earth – 17 August 1996
Ep. 21 - Humanoids from the Deep – 14 September 1996
Ep. 22 - Death Game – 21 September 1996
Ep. 23 - Vampirella – 28 September 1996
Ep. 24 - Scene of the Crime a.k.a. Ladykiller – 5 October 1996
Ep. 25 - When the Bullet Hits the Bone – 12 October 1996
Ep. 26 - Marquis de Sade a.k.a. Dark Prince: Intimate Tales of Marquis de Sade – 19 October 1996
Ep. 27 - Black Scorpion II – 13 May 1997
Ep. 28 - Alien Avengers II – 25 October 1997
Ep. 29 - Spacejacked – 8 November 1997
Ep. 30 - The Haunted Sea – 17 November 1997

References

Showtime (TV network) films
American science fiction horror films